The Jazz Messengers were a jazz band that existed with varying personnel for 35 years. Their discography consists of 47 studio albums, 21 live albums, 2 soundtracks, 6 compilations, and one boxed set.

Drummer Art Blakey was the leader or co-leader of the group throughout its existence. He is the drummer on all Jazz Messengers recordings and is therefore elided from personnel listings. Members recorded as either a quintet or sextet except for one 11-piece big band appearance and their expansion to a septet at the end.

The earliest recordings of the original Messengers were on Blue Note Records; all of the original Messengers (except bassist Doug Watkins) had released albums under their own name on the label. Blue Note 1518 was a reissue of two previously released 10" LPs credited to The Horace Silver Quintet.

A few recordings on Columbia Records followed with a couple different formations. As the second Messengers lineup stabilized they recorded for the RCA sub-label Vik Records, interspersed with one-off recordings for Cadet Records, Jubilee Records, and Atlantic.

Starting in 1959, a new lineup with Lee Morgan, Benny Golson, Bobby Timmons, Jymie Merritt, and later Wayne Shorter, Freddie Hubbard, and Curtis Fuller would see the group return to Blue Note for several years. This group also traveled to Europe where a couple albums on the French Fontana Records appeared. In 1961, there was a single album on Impulse! Records. In 1963 the first of three releases appeared on Riverside Records, while new releases on Blue Note continued to be issued.

After Wayne Shorter departed for Miles Davis's Second Great Quintet, the band signed with Quincy Jones' Mercury sub-label Limelight Records for three more releases starting in 1965.

Except for a 1970 release on the obscure Catalyst, and various bootlegs, the band did not release a recording between 1966 and 1972, when they re-appeared on Prestige Records for three more albums. In 1975 the band released an album with guest artist Sonny Stitt on the Swedish Sonet Records, then came two albums on Roulette Records in 1976 and 1978.

Starting in 1978, the band began to release albums on the Dutch Timeless Records and the Concord Jazz subsidiary of Concord Records. These groups included a changing lineup of young jazz musicians such as: Wynton and Branford Marsalis, Terence Blanchard, Donald Harrison, Wallace Roney, Mulgrew Miller, and Lonnie Plaxico.

Near the end, there were two albums on the Italian Soul Note label, and the final album on A&M Records. The Jazz Messengers came to an end with the death of Blakey in 1990.

Studio albums 
Albums are listed in order of earliest recording session. Some albums were not released for many years after their recording. The formats listed are the formats issued at the original release date. Most of the albums have been reissued on compact disc, many with additional tracks. Some albums have also been reissued or repackaged on varying labels and formats. See the specific album articles for reissue information.

Live albums

Soundtracks

Compilation albums

Notes

References

External links
 
  as Art Blakey & The Jazz Messengers

Jazz Messengers
Discography
Jazz Messengers